Im Sung-jae (born 30 March 1998), also known as Sungjae Im, is a South Korean professional golfer. Im won twice and was Player of the Year on the 2018 Web.com Tour. He was Rookie of the Year for the 2018–19 PGA Tour, and got his first PGA Tour victory at The Honda Classic in March 2020.

Professional career
Im turned professional in 2015. In 2016 and 2017 he played on the Japan Golf Tour, his best finish being joint runner-up in the 2017 Mynavi ABC Championship. In 2017 he finished 12th in the tour money list and 5th in the scoring average. He played a number of tournaments on the Korean Tour, his best finish being joint runner-up in the 2017 T-up Gswing Mega Open.

In December 2017, Im finished second in the Web.com Tour Q-school, including a third round of 60. Im had three solo runner-up finishes, in The Bahamas Great Abaco Classic, the Knoxville Open and the Pinnacle Bank Championship, and finished the regular season by winning the WinCo Foods Portland Open. He led the regular season money list and was named Web.com Tour Player of the Year.

In the 2018–19 PGA Tour season, Im won the PGA Tour Rookie of the Year. He became just the 13th rookie to qualify for the Tour Championship in the FedEx Cup era, ultimately finishing 19th in the standings. Im led the tour in starts (35) and cuts made (26), and his 118 rounds were 18 more than the nearest competitor. He had seven top-10s in 2019, highlighted by a T-3 at the Arnold Palmer Invitational, and finished 17th in strokes gained. Im joined Stewart Cink (1996–97) as the only players to be named the Korn Ferry Tour Player of the Year and PGA Tour Rookie of the Year in consecutive seasons.

On 22 September 2019, Im lost the Sanderson Farms Championship in Jackson, Mississippi in a playoff to Sebastián Muñoz.

In December 2019, Im played on the International team at the 2019 Presidents Cup at Royal Melbourne Golf Club in Australia. The U.S. team won 16–14. Im went 3–1–1 and won his Sunday singles match against Gary Woodland.

On 1 March 2020, Im won The Honda Classic at PGA National Resort and Spa in Palm Beach Gardens, Florida, with a final round of 66 and an overall score of −6. He finished one stroke ahead of Mackenzie Hughes, and moved to second place in the FedEx Cup standings.

In November 2020, Im finished tied for second place at the Masters Tournament; five shots behind Dustin Johnson.

On 10 October 2021, Im won the Shriners Children's Open at TPC Summerlin in Las Vegas, Nevada for his second PGA Tour title in his 100th start. Im shot a final round 9-under 62 and won by four shots over Matthew Wolff, coming from three behind at the start of the day.

Im qualified for the International team at the 2022 Presidents Cup; he won two, tied one and lost two of the five matches he played.

Professional wins (5)

PGA Tour wins (2)

PGA Tour playoff record (0–1)

Web.com Tour wins (2)

Korean Tour wins (1)

Results in major championships
Results not in chronological order before 2019 and in 2020.

CUT = missed the half-way cut
"T" indicates a tie for a place
NT = No tournament due to COVID-19 pandemic

Summary

Most consecutive cuts made – 3 (2021 PGA – 2022 Masters)
Longest streak of top-10s – 1 (twice)

Results in The Players Championship

CUT = missed the halfway cut
"T" indicates a tie for a place
C = Cancelled after the first round due to the COVID-19 pandemic

Results in World Golf Championships
 
1Cancelled due to COVID-19 pandemic

NT = No tournament
"T" = Tied
Note that the Championship and Invitational were discontinued from 2022.

Team appearances
Professional
Presidents Cup (representing the International team): 2019, 2022

See also
2018 Web.com Tour Finals graduates

References

External links
 
 
 
 
 

South Korean male golfers
Japan Golf Tour golfers
PGA Tour golfers
Olympic golfers of South Korea
Golfers at the 2020 Summer Olympics
Korn Ferry Tour graduates
Sportspeople from Jeju Province
1998 births
Living people